The 1919 Cork Intermediate Hurling Championship was the 11th staging of the Cork Intermediate Hurling Championship since its establishment by the Cork County Board.

Fairhill won the championship following a walkover by Dromina in the final.

Results

Final

References

Cork Intermediate Hurling Championship
Cork Intermediate Hurling Championship